Mrutyunjaya Nayak (born 1 July 1952 in Phulbani, Odisha) is an educationalist, social worker and former politician from Odisha. He served as member of the Lok Sabha representing Phulbani (Lok Sabha constituency). He was elected to 7th, 10th and 11th Lok Sabha and is a member of the Indian National Congress party.

From 2007 to 2010, Nayak served on the 2nd National Commission for Scheduled Castes.

Personal life 
Nayak was educated at Kholikote College. He is married to Minati Panigrahi and has four children. In addition to his other work, Nayak has published two books.

References

India MPs 1996–1997
People from Phulbani
1952 births
Living people
India MPs 1991–1996
India MPs 1980–1984
Lok Sabha members from Odisha
Indian National Congress politicians from Odisha